Salvatore Senese (3 April 1935 – 16 June 2019) was an Italian magistrate and politician who served as an MP.

References

1935 births
2019 deaths
Italian politicians